Arthur Edward Sewell (1872–1946) was an English architect, particularly known for the public houses he designed whilst working as the in-house architect for Truman's Brewery. His career peaked in the 1920s and 1930s, and at least five pubs that he designed in that period are now listed buildings with Historic England. In all, he designed around 50 pubs.

Career

Sewell was the lead in-house architect for Truman's Brewery between 1910 and 1939, and he designed around 50 pubs during his lifetime. His career peaked in the 1920s and 1930s when English brewers were trying to shed the Victorian sawdust-on-the-floor image of their pubs for a less rowdy atmosphere with a greater appeal to women—a concept termed the "improved pub". His pub designs generally eschewed the then fashionable modernism in favour of nostalgic neo-Georgian or neo-Tudor designs that presented a dignified front that celebrated Englishness. According to Nikolaus Pevsner in The Buildings of England, Sewell's pubs "usually sport attractive faience decoration and domestic architectural motifs". The last known pub designed by Sewell was the Royal George, near Euston ( 1939).

1920s
In 1923, Sewell designed The Royal Oak, a Grade II listed public house at 73 Columbia Road, Bethnal Green, London, E2, for Truman's Brewery.

1930s
In the 1930s, he designed The Ivy House, a Grade II listed pub at 40 Stuart Road, Nunhead, London, also for Truman's Brewery.

In 1930–32, he designed the Rose and Crown, Stoke Newington, a Grade II listed pub at 199 Stoke Newington Church Street, Stoke Newington, for Truman's Brewery.

In 1931, he designed The Railway Hotel in Station Road, Edgware, for Truman, Hanbury & Buxton, which Pevsner described as "the most exuberant of their neo-Tudor inns, complete with half-timbering, clustered brick-stacks, carved bargeboards and decorative rainwaterheads".

The Goat, Forty Hill, Enfield, (1932) was a neo-Tudor design with "picturesque chimneystacks and intricately carved bargeboards".

In 1934–35, he designed The Station, Stoneleigh, a Grade II listed pub at Stoneleigh Broadway, Stoneleigh, Epsom, Surrey.

In 1935–36, he designed The Stag's Head in Hoxton, London.

In 1936, he designed the Golden Heart, Spitalfields, a Grade II listed public house at 110 Commercial Street, London, E1 6LZ, for Truman's Brewery.

In 1936–37, he designed The Green Man in Kingsbury, north London.

In 1937, he designed the Duke of Edinburgh at Brixton.

Legacy
Several of the pubs designed by Sewell have been listed by Historic England and four pubs designed by him were included in the 19 inter-war pubs listed in August 2015.

References

Further reading
Elwall, Robert. (1983) Bricks & beer: English pub architecture, 1830–1939. British Architectural Library. 
Gutzke, David. (2005) Pubs and progressives: Reinventing the public house in England, 1896–1960. Northern Illinois University Press.

External links

1872 births
1946 deaths
20th-century English architects
Public house architects
A. E. Sewell buildings